Miljenko Dovečer (born 9 November 1958) is a Croatian retired footballer and manager.

Playing career
Dovečer played for Graničar Novakovac, Čakovec, Varteks, and Nafta. He earned the distinction of scoring the very first goal of the Slovenian PrvaLiga in independent Slovenia.

Managerial career
Dovečer replaced Predrag Jurić as manager of Međimurje in March 2005. In September 2007, he succeeded Ivan Bedi to become manager of Međimurje for a second time. In August 2013, Dovečer took charge of Omladinac Novo Selo Rok.

Dovečer was appointed sports director at Međimurje in June 2016.

References

External links
 

1958 births
Living people
Association football wingers
Yugoslav footballers
Croatian footballers
NK Čakovec players
NK Varaždin players
NK Nafta Lendava players
Slovenian PrvaLiga players
Croatian expatriate footballers
Expatriate footballers in Slovenia
Croatian expatriate sportspeople in Slovenia
Croatian football managers
NK Međimurje managers
Croatian Football League managers